Michele Sharon Jaffe (born March 20, 1970) is an American writer. She has authored novels in several genres, including historical romance, suspense thrillers, and novels for young adults.

Early life and education
Jaffe was born in Los Angeles, California. She is a 1991 graduate of Harvard University, where she earned a B.A. degree. Jaffe worked at the Huntington Library, an educational and research institution in San Marino, California. She returned to Harvard and in 1998 earned a Ph.D. in comparative literature.

Writing career
After writing a book on the Renaissance, she decided to foray into fiction, starting with a romance novel set in the Renaissance. The debut novel, The Stargazer, was published in 1999, initiating a four-book saga of historical fiction.

Soon afterward, she left the historical sphere, moving to suspense thrillers such as Lover Boy and Bad Girl in 2003.

She then wrote her first Young Adult book, Bad Kitty, published in January 2006, and the following month, it was named Book of the Month in the Meg Cabot Book Club. The next year, she published Kiss and Tell which was included in the anthology Prom Nights from Hell. In 2008, she wrote Kitty Kitty, the sequel of Bad Kitty, and the same year was published its graphic novel, Catnipped. Her latest YA novel is "Rosebush," which was published on December 7, 2010.

Jaffe is friends with bestselling Young Adult author Meg Cabot; they occasionally blogged advice columns together on Cabot's website. Thus persisted until Jaffe got her own Young Adult website. Now, she writes advice blogs on her own site more frequently.

Personal life 
Jaffe is divorced, and living in NYC.

Bibliography

Historical Novels

Arboretti Family Saga Series (Romance)
 The Stargazer - 1999
  The Water Nymph  - 2000
 Lady Killer/Secret Admirer - 2002

Contemporary Thrillers of suspense
Lover Boy - 2004
Bad Girl - 2003

Young Adult Novels

Bad Kitty Series
Bad Kitty - 2006
Kitty Kitty - 2008

Single Novels
Rosebush - 2010
Ghost Flower - 2012
Minders - 2014

Omnibus in Collaboration
Prom Nights from Hell - 2007 (Exterminator's Daughter by Meg Cabot, Madison Avery and the Dim Reaper by Kim Harrison, Kiss and Tell by Michele Jaffe, Hell on Earth by Stephenie Meyer and The Corsage by Lauren Myracle)

Graphic Novels

Bad Kitty Series
Catnipped - 2008

Nonfiction
Story of O: Prostitutes and Other Good For Nothings in the Renaissance - 1999

References and sources

External links
 Official Site of Michele Jaffe
 Site of Bad Kitty

Living people
1970 births
Harvard University alumni
20th-century American novelists
21st-century American novelists
American romantic fiction writers
American mystery writers
American thriller writers
American children's writers
American women children's writers
Women romantic fiction writers
Women mystery writers
American women novelists
Women thriller writers
20th-century American women writers
21st-century American women writers